Šedivec (feminine Šedivcová) is a Czech surname. Notable people with the surname include:

Jaroslav Šedivec (born 1981), Czech footballer
Jiřina Šedivcová (born 1940), Czechoslovak-American canoeist
Josef Šedivec, Czechoslovak-American canoeist

Czech-language surnames